SPY is a three-letter acronym that may refer to:

 SPDR S&P 500 Trust ETF, NYSE symbol
 SPY or MOWAG SPY, a military vehicle
 SPY ACT (Securely Protect Yourself Against Cyber Trespass), a 2005 US proposed cyber-security regulation

See also
 Spy (disambiguation)
 AN/SPY-1 and AN/SPY-3, U.S. Navy radars